Double vie may refer to:

Books
Double vie, 2001 novel by Pierre Assouline, winner of the 2001 Prix des libraires
La Double Vie, audiobook memoirs of Jean-Roger Caussimon

Music
Double vie, 1988 live album by French singer Alain Chamfort
"Double vie" (Orelsan song), single from the 2011 album Le chant des sirènes by French rapper Orelsan